Myzinum is a genus of wasps in the family Thynnidae. There are 63 species presently recognized in Myzinum.
 They measure 7–24 mm. Found in New World, Myzinum wasps are most diverse in the Neotropics. They are found in meadows, fields, and lawns. They parasitize white grubs (scarab larvae), especially Phyllophaga. They are used as biological controls.

Selected Species

 Myzinum carolinianum Panzer
 Myzinum frontale Cresson
 Myzinum fulviceps Cameron
 Myzinum maculatum (Fabricius, 1793)
 Myzinum navajo Krombein
 Myzinum obscurum (Fabricius, 1805)
 Myzinum quinquecinctum (Fabricius, 1775) (five-banded thynnid wasp)

References

Further reading

External links

 

Thynnidae